Mount Olivet Cumberland Presbyterian Church is a historic church on Kentucky Route 526 in Bowling Green, Kentucky.  It was built in 1845 and added to the National Register in 1979.

It is a gable-front brick building, with brick laid in common bond.

The land on which it was built was a camp meeting site during the early 1800s, as part of the Second Great Awakening.

References

Presbyterian churches in Kentucky
Churches on the National Register of Historic Places in Kentucky
Churches completed in 1845
19th-century Presbyterian church buildings in the United States
Churches in Warren County, Kentucky
Greek Revival church buildings in Kentucky
National Register of Historic Places in Bowling Green, Kentucky
Cumberland Presbyterian Church
1845 establishments in Kentucky